PTP, also known as Purple Tape Pedigree, is an American artist collective and independent record label based in New York City. PTP has been called "New York’s experimental incubator", and the collective has released recordings named among the best in new experimental, hip hop, metal, avant-garde, and electronic music. Pitchfork noted that "PTP's mission seems to be to annihilate genre boundaries and revel in the brilliant debris", and VICE has called PTP "home to some of the most boundary pushing music being made".

Artist Geng (stylized GENG PTP) founded the collective as a media platform in 2009, with label operations beginning in 2012. Artists associated with PTP include Dreamcrusher, YATTA, Dis Fig, Armand Hammer, Saint Abdullah, Celestial Trax, Among The Rocks And Roots, DeForrest Brown Jr. (also known as Speaker Music), H31R (the duo of maassai and JWords), madam data, Amani, photographer Richard R. Ross, and Geng, who also performs and records as King Vision Ultra.

PTP's projects include Silent Weapons, a live performance series raising money for causes including prison abolition and immigrant rights.

History 

In 2009, New York City born and based artist GENG PTP started a wide-ranging music blog on hip hop, hardcore, and punk; his friend NOTE assisted him and handled visuals and design. Geng named the platform Purple Tape Pedigree after Wu-Tang rapper Raekwon's 1995 hip hop classic Only Built 4 Cuban Linx (often called "the purple tape" for the colored plastic of its original cassette release); the album came out the same year Geng, then in his teens, transitioned from cassette decks to turntables, going on to collaborate with the Atoms Family hip hop collective in the late '90s and produce beats for Dipset in the early 2000s. Friends soon joined Geng and Note in writing for the blog, creating visuals, organizing radio sets, booking performances, and eventually releasing music.

The first two official Purple Tape Pedigree releases came out in 2012 and 2015; after the second, Celestial Trax's Ride Or Die EP, PTP began to release recordings more frequently. As the platform grew into a collective with a distinct identity not solely affiliated with hip hop or DJ culture, Geng began exclusively using the acronym PTP. Later he resumed using the full name and acronym interchangeably, explaining in 2021 that he doesn't feel a need to "put the Raekwon reference to the side" given the name's personal significance and potential to draw attention to a "lineage" that might otherwise be overlooked.

As PTP gained greater recognition, the collective began to prioritize using their platform to provide support for community members in need. In 2018, PTP started a live performance series called Silent Weapons to raise money for organizations including Books Through Bars, The Bronx Freedom Fund, Black Alliance for Just Immigration, and Kids in Need of Defense. PTP has published several photo books, the first of which was also called Silent Weapons; the volume, by photographer Richard R. Ross, documents the first year of performances in the namesake series. In 2017, PTP released a benefit album for Puerto Rico following Hurricane Maria, and in 2020 PTP was noted for donations to racial justice initiatives, as well as for including a PDF of Alex S. Vitale’s The End Of Policing with all digital purchases.

Critical reception 

Records in PTP's catalog have been praised as among the best in experimental music by publications and organizations including NPR Music, The Wire, Bandcamp Daily, Pitchfork, Mixmag, CVLT Nation, and SLUG Magazine. Notable releases include Celestial Trax's Nothing is Real (2017); Kepla and DeForrest Brown Jr.'s Absent Personae (2017) and The Wages Of Being Black Is Death (2018); YATTA's WAHALA, which was included in Pitchfork, Bandcamp Daily, and the Wire as among the best albums of 2019; Dis Fig's PURGE (2019); 9T Antiope's Nocebo (2019) and Placebo (2020); Copperhead's Gazing in the Dark (2019); Dreamcrusher's Panopticon! and Another Country; Amani and King Vision Ultra's An Unknown Infinite (2020); and madam data's The Gospel of the Devourer (2021), a "sweeping epic of metal, noise and drone" featuring Moor Mother, Mental Jewelry, and King Vision Ultra.

Geng has pushed against the description of PTP as solely a label, saying the group's principles and practices of peer support and coalition-building are more akin to those of an artist collective or community. The outlet has nevertheless received significant recognition for its work releasing music: alongside many other accolades, PTP was a featured label in Resident Advisor and named among the TIU Mag best labels of 2015 and Mixmag best labels of 2016. In 2019, Tiny Mix Tapes included the "beautiful experiment" of PTP among their favorite labels of the decade: "Drawing from and experimenting with the rich collective productions, social reimaginings, and conspiratorial caretakings tagged and thumping throughout NYC — Wu Tang, Powerule Crew, Mobb Deep — caretaker Geng less curated than colluded, clearing space within the chokeholding architectures of foreclosure and incarceration for séances of breath, ugly cries, lustrous comeups, and, above all, love stories".

Discography 

Includes cassette reissues and both official and "unofficial" releases (i.e., those released without a catalogue number).

References 

Musical collectives
Hip hop collectives
Electronic music organizations
Experimental music record labels
American independent record labels
American hip hop record labels
Electronic music record labels
Doom metal record labels
Noise music record labels